Dezron Lamont Douglas is an American jazz double bassist, composer, and producer.  He has produced for Louis Hayes, and Brandee Younger.

Biography
Douglas was raised in Hartford, Connecticut and studied tuba and bass at the Hartford Conservatory of Music.  He attended The Hartt School at the University of Hartford majoring in African American Music and History under the tutelage of alto saxophonist Jackie McLean. He is the nephew of drummer and composer Walter Bolden.

Douglas has released six albums as a leader. His 2012 debut record, Live at Smalls, earned a positive review in The New York Times, which wrote: "Learned as it may be, this is living-language music — jazz as it’s practiced, more than as it’s studied."

As a sideman, Douglas has recorded with Cyrus Chestnut, Michael Carvin, Louis Hayes, Steve Davis, George Cables, Papo Vasquez, Enrico Rava, Eric Reed, Abraham Burton, Eric McPherson, Tomasz Stańko, Makaya McCraven and Brandee Younger. In April 2019, Douglas' playing was featured in the documentary Homecoming, by Beyoncé. The recording used was from an NPR Music field recording released in 2013.

He is longstanding member of the Ravi Coltrane Quartet and has performed with the Louis Hayes Jazz Communicators.

In 2019, Douglas was the winner of the Downbeat critics poll in the category of "Rising Star bassist". Douglas was featured on DownBeat magazine's July 2020 cover along with Brandee Younger and six other artists.

In 2021, Dezron joined the Trey Anastasio Band, replacing the late Tony Markellis.

Discography

As leader
2012: Underground, Independent
2012: Walkin' My Baby Back Home, Venus Records
2012: Ganbare Nippon, Venus Records
2013: Dezron Douglas Live at Smalls, Smalls Live
2016: DE3: Live at Maxwells, Sunnyside Records
2017: Soul Jazz, Venus Records
2018: Black Lion, Independent
2019: Solomon Grundy, Independent (single) 
2020: Cobra, Independent (single)
2020: Force Majeure, International Anthem
2021: Meditations on Faith, Independent (single)
2022: Freeway, Independent (single)
2022: Atalaya, International Anthem

As sideman
With Cyrus Chestnut
2007: Cyrus Plays Elvis
2010: Journeys
2010: The Cyrus Chestnut Quartet
2010: Plenty Swing, Plenty Soul: Live at Dizzy's with Eric Reed
2011: Moonlight Sonata
2013: Soul Brother Cool

With Brandee Younger
2011:  Prelude, Independent
2014:  The Brandee Younger 4tet, Live at the Breeding Ground, Independent
2015:  Supreme Sonacy, Blue Note Records / Revive Music
2016:  Wax & Wane, Independent/ Revive Music
2018:  A Day In The Life: Impressions of Pepper, Impulse!
2019:  Soul Awakening Independent
2021:  Somewhere Different, Impulse!

With Steve Davis
2008: Outlook
2011: Images
2019: Correlations

With Louis Hayes
2014: Return of the Jazz Communicators
2014: Live at Cory Weeds Cellar Jazz Club
2017: Serenade for Horace

With Makaya McCraven
2018: Universal Beings
2020: Universal Beings E&F sides

References

External links
 

Year of birth missing (living people)
Living people
American jazz double-bassists
African-American jazz musicians
University of Hartford alumni
Musicians from Hartford, Connecticut
21st-century African-American people